Austrocochlea piperina is a species of sea snail, a marine gastropod mollusk in the family Trochidae, the top snails.

Description
The height of the shell attains 8 mm, its diameter 7.5 mm. The small, imperforate, thick, solid shell has a globose-conic shape. It is blackish, speckled and maculated all over with yellowish. The body whorl is spirally encircled by two narrow bands of black articulated with orange. The short spire is generally eroded more or less. The apex is acute or eroded. The 4 to 5 whorls are slightly convex, spirally finely striate, the striae often almost obsolete. The aperture is rounded. The acute outer lip is arcuate, thickened within, the nacre inside appearing finely lirate . The columella is short, oblique, not as wide as usual in this group, quite obviously bluntly toothed in the middle.

Distribution
This marine species occurs off Hawaii, Fiji and Taiwan.

References

External links
 To Encyclopedia of Life
 To World Register of Marine Species

piperina
Gastropods described in 1849